Şambul (also, Shambul, Shambulbina, and Shambuloba) is a village and municipality in the Balakan Rayon of Azerbaijan.  It has a population of 2,798.  The municipality consists of the villages of Şambul and İsaqlıgirmə.

References 

Populated places in Balakan District